The term cleanser refers to a product that cleans or removes dirt or other substances. A cleanser could be a detergent, and there are many types of cleansers that are produced with a specific objective or focus. For instance a degreaser or carburetor cleanser used in automotive mechanics for cleaning certain engine and car parts.

Other varieties include the ones used in cosmetology, dermatology or general skin care. In this case, a cleanser is a facial care product that is used to remove make-up, skin care product residue, microbes, dead skin cells, oils, sweat, dirt and other types of daily pollutants from the face. These washing aids help prevent filth-accumulation, infections, pores clogs, irritation and cosmetic issues like dullness from dead skin buildup & excessive skin shine from sebum buildup. This can also aid in preventing or treating certain skin conditions; such as acne. Cleansing is the first step in a skin care regimen and can be used in addition of a toner and moisturizer, following cleansing.    
Sometimes “double cleansing” before moving on to any other skincare product is encouraged to ensure the full  dissolution & removal of residues that might be more resistant to cleansing, such as; waterproof makeup, water-resistant sunscreen, the excess sebum of oily skin-type individuals and air pollution particles. Double cleansing usually involves applying a lipid-soluble cleanser (e.g., cleansing balm, cleansing oil, micellar cleansing water, others...) to dry skin and massaging it around the face for a length of time, then the area may or may not be splashed with water. Any type of aqueous cleanser is then emulsified with water and used as the main cleanser that removes the first cleanser and further cleans the skin. Then the face is finally thoroughly rinsed with water until no filth or product residue remains.

Using a cleanser designated for the facial skin to remove dirt is considered to be a better alternative to bar soap or another form of skin cleanser not specifically formulated for the face for the following reasons:
 Bar soap has an alkaline pH (in the area of 9 to 10), and the pH of a healthy skin surface is around 4.7 on average. This means that soap can change the balance present in the skin to favor the overgrowth of some types of bacteria, increasing acne. In order to maintain a healthy pH balance and skin health, your skin must sit on the proper pH level; some individuals who use bar soap choose to use pH-balancing toners after cleaning in attempts to compensate for the alkalinity of their soaps.
 Bar cleansers have thickeners that allow them to assume a bar shape. These thickeners can clog pores, which may lead to pimples in susceptible individuals. Wet dry shampoos, face wash and body washes are often labeled as "bar cleansers" because they have thickeners that allow them to assume a bar shape. These thickeners can clog pores, which may lead to pimples in susceptible individuals.
 Using bar soap on the face can remove natural oils from the skin that form a barrier against water loss. This causes the sebaceous glands to subsequently overproduce oil, a condition known as reactive seborrhoea, which will lead to clogged pores. In order to prevent drying out the skin, many cleansers incorporate moisturizers.

Facial cleansers
 
Facial cleansers include the following: 
Balm cleansers
Bar cleansers
Clay cleansers 
Cold cream cleansers
Creamy cleansers
Exfoliant/Scrub cleansers
Foam/Foaming cleansers
Gel/Jelly cleansers
Lotion cleansers
Micellar cleansers
Milky cleansers
Oil cleansers
Powder cleansers 
Treatment/Medicated cleansers (aloe vera, benzoyl peroxide, carboxylic acids, charcoal, colloidal oatmeal, honey, sulphur, vitamin c, lighteners)
Tool cleansers (cotton rounds, konjac sponges, microfiber cloths, mitts, silicone brushes, spinning brushes, sponges, towelettes/wipes)

Cleansers that have active ingredients are more suitable for oily skins to prevent breakouts. But they may overdry and irritate dry skin, this may make the skin appear and feel worse. Dehydrated skin may require a creamy lotion-type cleanser. These are normally too gentle to be effective on oily or even normal skin, but dry skin requires much less cleansing power. It may be a good idea to select a cleanser that is alcohol-free for use on dry, sensitive, or dehydrated skin.

Some cleansers may incorporate fragrance or essential oils. However, for some people, these cleansers may irritate the skin and often provoke allergic responses. People with such sensitivity should find cleansers that are pH-balanced cosmetic balanced, contain fewer irritants, suit many variating skin types, and do not make the skin feel dehydrated directly after cleansing. Tight, uncomfortable skin is often dehydrated and may appear shiny after cleansing, even when no sebum is present. This is due to the taughtening and 'stripping' effect some cleaners can have on the skin. One should discontinue use of a cleanser that upsets the balance of the skin; cleansers should work with the skin not against it. Finding the right cleanser can involve some trial-and-error.

References

Skin care
Cleaning products
Personal hygiene products